Taking Care of Business is an album by saxophonist Oliver Nelson recorded in 1960 and released on the New Jazz label.

Reception

Allmusic reviewer Scott Yanow stated: "Oliver Nelson would gain his greatest fame later in his short life as an arranger/composer but this superior session puts the emphasis on his distinctive tenor and alto playing ... Nelson remains a vastly underrated saxophonist and all six performances on this recommended CD reissue (four of them his originals) are excellent".

Track listing 
All compositions by Oliver Nelson, except as indicated
 "Trane Whistle"  - 9:57
 "Doxy" (Sonny Rollins) - 6:59
 "In Time"  - 5:33
 "Lou's Good Dues Blues"  - 6:18
 "All the Way"  (Sammy Cahn, Jimmy Van Heusen) - 7:34
 "Groove"  - 6:27

Personnel 
Oliver Nelson - tenor saxophone, alto saxophone
Lem Winchester - vibraphone
Johnny "Hammond" Smith - organ
George Tucker - bass
Roy Haynes - drums

References 

Oliver Nelson albums
1960 albums
Albums produced by Esmond Edwards
Albums recorded at Van Gelder Studio
New Jazz Records albums